Canterbury railway station is located on the Lilydale and Belgrave lines in Victoria, Australia. It serves the eastern Melbourne suburb of Canterbury, and it opened on 1 December 1882.

History

Canterbury station opened on 1 December 1882, when the railway line from Camberwell was extended to Lilydale. Like the suburb itself, the station was named after Viscount Canterbury, Governor of Victoria between 1866 and 1873.

In the 1930s, a crossover was provided at the southern (Up) end of the station, and a signal box provided to work the interlocked level crossing gates.

In early 1966, work on the grade separation of the Canterbury Road level crossing commenced. To facilitate construction, the interlocked gates were replaced with boom barriers, and the signal box was abolished. On 15 September 1968, the current station opened, with all works completed by December of that year. The works involved the use of a temporary track to keep trains operating, and raising the station six metres. In December 1971, services on the third track from East Camberwell were extended though the station to Box Hill.

Platforms and services

Canterbury has one island platform with two faces and one side platform. It is serviced by Metro Trains' Lilydale and Belgrave line services.

Platform 1:
  all stations and limited express services to Flinders Street
  all stations and limited express services to Flinders Street

Platform 2:
  all stations services to Lilydale
  all stations services to Belgrave

Platform 3:
  weekday all stations services to Lilydale; weekday all stations services to Blackburn
  weekday all stations services to Belgrave; weekday all stations services to Blackburn

Transport links

Kinetic Melbourne operates one route via Canterbury station, under contract to Public Transport Victoria:
 : Doncaster Park and Ride – Camberwell Shopping Centre

References

External links
 Melway map at street-directory.com.au

Railway stations in Melbourne
Railway stations in Australia opened in 1882
Railway stations in the City of Boroondara